Scopula marcidaria is a moth of the family Geometridae. It was described by John Henry Leech in 1897. It is found in western China.

References

Moths described in 1897
marcidaria
Endemic fauna of China
Moths of Asia